The Guaraqueçaba River is a river of Paraná state in southern Brazil. It discharges into the Baía das Laranjeiras within the municipality of the same name.

See also
List of rivers of Paraná

References

Rivers of Paraná (state)